Desperate is a 1947 suspense film noir directed by Anthony Mann and featuring Steve Brodie, Audrey Long, Raymond Burr, Douglas Fowley, William Challee and Jason Robards.

Plot
Steve Randall (Brodie) is an independent trucker who is hired by an old friend to haul some freight. Only when Steve arrives at the warehouse does he discover he has been hired to haul away stolen goods. Steve wants no part of the plot and resists, but a cop is killed as they're committing the burglary, and all except one manage to get away.

Later, after kidnapping and assaulting Steve, the criminals, led by Walt Radak (Burr), threaten to mutilate Randall's wife (Long) unless Steve confesses to the murder committed by Radak's brother, captured during the theft and sentenced to death for the cop-killing.

Steve plays along with the criminals just long enough to escape.  He takes his wife and leaves town, heading cross country. The couple are then pursued by both the cops and the crooks. Steve then discovers his wife is pregnant with their first child, making the stakes even higher that they get away to safety.

Cast
 Steve Brodie as Steve Randall
 Audrey Long as Mrs. Anne Randall
 Raymond Burr as Walt Radak
 Douglas Fowley as Pete Lavitch, Private Eye 
 William Challee as Reynolds 
 Jason Robards Sr. as Det. Lt. Louie Ferrari 
 Freddie Steele as Shorty Abbott
 Lee Frederick as Joe Daly
 Paul E. Burns as Uncle Jan
 Ilka Grüning as Aunt Klara

Home media
Warner Bros. released the film on DVD on July 13, 2010, in its Film Noir Classic Collection, Vol. 5.

References

External links
 
 
 
 
 

1947 films
1947 crime drama films
American crime drama films
American black-and-white films
1940s chase films
1940s English-language films
Film noir
Films directed by Anthony Mann
RKO Pictures films
Trucker films
American chase films
Films scored by Paul Sawtell
1940s American films